The Tanabata Sho (Japanese 七夕賞) is a Grade 3 horse race for Thoroughbreds aged three and over, run in July over a distance of 2000 metres on turf at Fukushima Racecourse.

It was first run in 1965 and has held Grade 3 status since 1984. The race was initially run over 1800 metres before being moved up to its current distance in 1980. It was run at Niigata Racecourse in 1974 and 1989, Tokyo Racecourse in 2000 and Nakayama Racecourse in 2011.

Winners since 2000

Earlier winners

 1984 - Hokuto Kimpai
 1985 - Russian Blue
 1986 - Sakura Toko
 1987 - Dyna Shoot
 1988 - Kosei
 1989 - Valeroso
 1990 - Idaten Turbo
 1991 - Sea Carrier
 1992 - Riesen Schlag
 1993 - Twin Turbo
 1994 - Nifty Dancer
 1995 - Fujiyama Kenzan
 1996 - Sakura Eiko O
 1997 - Meiner Bridge
 1998 - Offside Trap
 1999 - Sunday Sarah

See also
 Horse racing in Japan
 List of Japanese flat horse races

References

Turf races in Japan